Holcocera plagatola is a moth in the family Blastobasidae. It is found in Guatemala.

The length of the forewings is 9.5–9.7 mm. The forewings are greyish brown intermixed with a few dark-brown scales. The hindwings are translucent brown basally, gradually darkening to the apex.

The larvae feed on Persea americana. They were found feeding in the fruit pulp surrounding the seed and possibly the seed itself.

Etymology
The species epithet, plagatola, is derived from Latin plagatus (meaning streaked) and refers to the dark streaks of the forewing pattern.

References

Moths described in 2009
plagatola